Bank of Pee Dee Building (also known as Economy Auto Supply) is a historic bank building located at 201 East Washington Street in Rockingham, Richmond County, North Carolina. It was built in 1904–1905, and is a two-story, red brick early commercial style building. It has a pedimented front gable roof

It was listed on the National Register of Historic Places in 1983.

References

Bank buildings on the National Register of Historic Places in North Carolina
Commercial buildings completed in 1905
Buildings and structures in Randolph County, North Carolina
National Register of Historic Places in Richmond County, North Carolina
Buildings designated early commercial in the National Register of Historic Places
1905 establishments in North Carolina